They Can't Hang Me is a 1955 British drama film directed by Val Guest and starring Terence Morgan, Yolande Donlan and Anthony Oliver. It was based on a novel by Leonard Mosley. It was shot at Shepperton Studios near London. The film's sets were designed by the art director Joseph Bato.

Plot
A senior civil servant, Pitt (Morell) has been convicted of a murder and sentenced to death. Days before his execution, Pitt reveals that he has been passing on top secret information to an agent of a foreign power and offers to reveal the identity of his handler in exchange for a reprieve. With only five days before Pitt's execution, debonair Special Branch Inspector Ralph Brown (Morgan) takes on the task of identifying the spy before he flees the country.

The film uses Sidney Torch's music for The Black Museum for its title and some of its incidental music.

The starring role of Brown was an unusual part for Morgan, who was better known for playing villains.

Cast
 Terence Morgan as Inspector Ralph Brown
 Yolande Donlan as Jill Wilson
 Anthony Oliver as Inspector Newcombe
 André Morell as Robert Isaac Pitt
 Reginald Beckwith as Harold
 Ursula Howells as Antonia Pitt
 Guido Lorraine as Pietr Revski
 Basil Dignam as Wing Commander Riddle
 John Horsley as Assistant Commissioner
 Mark Dignam as Prison Governor
 Raymond Rollett as Sir Robert Rosper
 Fred Johnson as Professor Robinson-Heston
 Arnold Marlé as Professor Karl Kopek
 Barry Lowe as Private Eric Colter
 Richard Cuthbert as Judge
 Diana Lambert as Young Woman

Critical reception
Radio Times calls the film "a minor Cold War thriller", adding, "(Val) Guest puts a neat (if downbeat) spin on events," and concluding, "the back-up cast is as solid as a rock, with Guest's wife Yolande Donlan putting in an effective appearance". TV Guide describes it as "slightly more interesting than the normal run of British spy films, thanks to an unusually intelligent script."

References

External links

1955 films
1955 drama films
1950s English-language films
Films directed by Val Guest
British spy drama films
Films based on British novels
British black-and-white films
1950s spy drama films
Films shot at Shepperton Studios
1950s British films